Justice Beck may refer to:

Joseph M. Beck (1823–1893), associate justice of the Iowa Supreme Court
Marcus Wayland Beck (1860–1943), associate justice of the Supreme Court of Georgia